The 2nd Pornhub Awards was a major pornography awards ceremony held October 11, 2019 at Orpheum Theatre in Los Angeles, California. The show was hosted by Asa Akira and featured musical performances by Bad Bunny, Ty Dolla Sign, Rico Nasty, Tommy Genesis and Kali Uchis.

Award winners and nominations 

Winners are in bold.

Additional award winners 

 Top Blowjob Performer: Mia Malkova
 Top Female Solo Performer: Elles (rescinded)
 Top Cosplay Performer Indigo White
 Top DP Performer Riley Reid
 Top Squirting Performer: Danika Mori
 Most Popular Gay Channel: CzechHunter
 Most Popular Trans Channel: Trans500
 Top Daddy Performer: Zilv Gudel

Fan award winners 

Fans voted for the winners of the following awards.

 Best Instagram: Abella Danger
 Best Twitter: Riley Reid
 Best Dick: Johnny Sins
 Nicest Pussy: Elsa Jean
 Favorite MILF: Brandi Love
 Nicest Tits: Dillion Harper
 Hottest Inked: Model Karma Rx
 Hottest Ass: Abella Danger
 Favorite Fetish Model: Mandy Flores
 Favorite Trans Model: Aubrey Kate
 Favorite Gay Model: Zilv Gudel
 Favorite BBW: Model Pinky
 Favorite Channel: Blacked
 Cam Performer of the Year: Jenny Blighe
 Best Snapchat: Adriana Chechik
 Favorite Newcomer: Autumn Falls
 Favorite Cosplayer: Mykinkydope
 Favorite Couple: Leolulu
 Best Fan Club: Asa Akira
 Best Modelhub: Nofacegirl

Production 
The show was hosted by Asa Akira and streamed on Pornhub. It was held the Orpheum Theatre in Los Angeles. The one hour and forty minute broadcast featured musical performances by Bad Bunny, Ty Dolla Sign, Rico Nasty and Kali Uchis.

References 

2019 awards
Pornographic film awards
MindGeek